Merrick and Rosso were an Australian comedy duo, composed of Merrick Watts (Merrick) and Tim Ross (Rosso). The duo began in stand up comedy, and first came together when they teamed up for what was intended to be a one-off comedy show in 1996. They are best known for their syndicated radio programs, TV shows, stand up comedy tours, comedy DVDs and books.

Radio
Merrick and Rosso first came to prominence performing a weekly guest spot on the drive-time program on Triple J radio in 1998.  They became full-time presenters for that segment for the next two years; regulars on their show included Myf Warhurst and Peter Helliar. In 2001, they moved to newly launched commercial radio station Nova 96.9 for the breakfast radio shift (6am to 9am). They remained in this time slot from the station's launch until the show's end.  Sami Lukis at one time served as a co-host until she moved to Brisbane at the end of 2007.  In 2008, actress Kate Ritchie began to co-host the show.  In 2009, previous co-host Lukis started co-hosting a breakfast program on Triple M in Sydney, directly competing with Merrick and Rosso. On 10 November 2009, Ross announced his impending departure from the Merrick, Rosso & Kate breakfast show. Ritchie also announced her departure from the show, while Watts planned to continue on radio. Ross's departure ended an 11-year radio partnership with Watts. Merrick and Rosso's final radio show as a duo on Nova 969 took place on 4 December 2009. Tributes were paid to them by comedians including Peter Helliar and Judith Lucy, as well as celebrities such as Tom Williams and Ray Hadley. Snippets of the duo's favourite prank calls were played, as well as an audio montage of highlights from the past nine years.

Television
Their first foray into television was a short-lived pay TV show, Planet Merrick and Rosso (later known as Super Planet Merrick and Rosso) on The Comedy Channel. In 2003 their television show Merrick and Rosso Unplanned debuted on the Nine Network, based on the antiformat established by Baddiel and Skinner Unplanned in the UK. It featured comedy, chat and audience interaction which ran for three seasons. In 2005, Merrick and Rosso starred in the television series The B Team on Network Ten. On 7 July 2007 they presented at Live Earth.

Merrick Watts has also appeared in the comedy series The Hollowmen and Thank God You're Here. In 2008, the duo starred in a new comedy series, The Merrick & Rosso Show on The Comedy Channel. He has also appeared as Marty Johnstone, a New Zealand drug dealer who was originally the leader of the Mr Asia drug syndicate in the hit series Underbelly: A Tale of Two Cities.

The Merrick & Rosso Show 
In 2008, Merrick and Rosso returned to Australia's Comedy Channel with an original format entitled The Merrick & Rosso Show.  A mixture of sketches, stunts and parodies, often featuring the guest star, it quickly became the highest rating show in the channel's fifteen-year history.  Guests throughout the first season were Ray Martin, Brendan Cowell, Kate Ritchie, The Veronicas, Stephen Curry, Ian Thorpe, Ryan 'Fitzy' Fitzgerald, Peter Helliar, Hugh Jackman, Dicko and Judith Lucy.

One popular sketch that picked up a following on YouTube and FunnyorDie was 'The Almost Transformers' which featured the stars disguised as a fridge and a washing machine for the purpose of terrifying shoppers. Another stunt included adopting an entire village in PNG (a popular trend amongst Hollywood celebrities) and renaming it Merrick & Rosso Land, distributing T-shirts bearing slogans such as "Sorry Madonna, I'm Taken", "Angelina Rejected Me" and "Property of Merrick And Rosso".

Guests for the second series included Will Ferrell, The Wiggles, Ed Phillips, Tommy Williams, Magda Szubanski, Bob Evans, Eskimo Joe, David Wenham, Asher Keddie, Charlotte Dawson and Alex Perry, Antonia Kidman and cricketer Stuart MacGill.

The show also created the anti-testimonial, where big-name celebrity guests who came into the Nova studios were given (often scripted) material and invited to explain why they could not or did not want to appear on the TV show.  Anti-Testimonials were given by Will Smith, Lily Allen, Russell Brand, Chris Rock, Ryan Reynolds, Kelly Clarkson, Rhys Darby, Seth Rogen, Macy Gray, Eric Hutchinson and Cesar Millan.

Podcast 
Apart from the official Nova 96.9 breakfast show podcast, Merrick & Rosso also recorded their own podcast Original Pirate Material on a daily basis. Their podcast is a mix of email reading, uncensored material and prank calls. The last Original Pirate Material podcast was published on 15 November 2006.

Discography

Studio albums

Video albums

Singles

Awards and nominations

ARIA Music Awards
The ARIA Music Awards are a set of annual ceremonies presented by Australian Recording Industry Association (ARIA), which recognise excellence, innovation, and achievement across all genres of the music of Australia. They commenced in 1987. 

! 
|-
| 1999 || Teenage Mullet Fury || rowspan="3"| ARIA Award for Best Comedy Release ||  || rowspan="3"| 
|-
| 2003 || From Us to Youse || 
|-
| 2008 || Live and Totally Wrong! ||

References

External links
Nova FM - Official Site
Merrick and Rosso Recipe
Triple J Stories - Merrick and Rosso

Triple J announcers
Australian comedy duos
ARIA Award winners
Australian comedy troupes